Leonard Peterson may refer to:
 Leonard Peterson (gymnast), Swedish gymnast
 Leonard Peterson (sound engineer), American sound engineer
 Len Peterson, Canadian playwright, screenwriter and novelist
 Len Peterson (footballer), Australian rules footballer